Klabat University is a Christian institution of higher learning. It was established on 7 October 1965 by Gereja Masehi Advent Hari Ketujuh (GMAHK). (GMAHK is the official name for the Seventh-day Adventist Church in Indonesia.) At present, the university is run by Yayasan Universitas Klabat under the care of Uni Konfrens Indonesia Kawasan Timur (UKIKT) or the East Indonesia Union Conference (EIUC) of the SDA.

It is a part of the Seventh-day Adventist education system, the world's second largest Christian school system.

Location
Klabat University is in the North Sulawesi province of Indonesia, in Airmadidi, a town near Manado city. Manado is the capital of North Sulawesi province. The university can be reached by public vehicles and takes about 30 minutes from Manado and the airport. The distance between Manado and Mount Klabat College is approximately 25 km.

Faculties
Klabat University consists of the following faculties:
 Faculty of Economics
 Faculty of Philosophy
 Faculty of Science, Education, and Teaching
 Faculty of Agriculture
 Faculty of Computer Science
 Faculty of Nursing 
 Secretarial Academy
 Management Postgraduate Studies
 Theology Postgraduate Studies

Ethical code
The teaching-learning process in the college is conducted in a religious environment. Christian values are respected and implemented by the institution.

See also

 List of Seventh-day Adventist colleges and universities
 Seventh-day Adventist education

References

External links
 Universitas Klabat
 Universitas Klabat, 4International Colleges & Universities.

Universities and colleges affiliated with the Seventh-day Adventist Church
Universities in Indonesia
Universities in North Sulawesi
Private universities and colleges in Indonesia